Belokalitvinsky District is an administrative and municipal district (raion), one of the forty-three in Rostov Oblast, Russia. It is located in the center of the oblast. Its administrative center is the town of Belaya Kalitva. Population: 102,039 (2010 Census);  The population of Belaya Kalitva accounts for 42.8% of the district's total population.

Notable residents 

Tatiana Kotova (born 1985 in Sholokhovsky), entertainer

References

Notes

Sources

Districts of Rostov Oblast